is a professional Japanese baseball player. He plays pitcher for the Tokyo Yakult Swallows.

References 

1995 births
Living people
Baseball people from Miyagi Prefecture
Japanese baseball players
Nippon Professional Baseball pitchers
Tohoku Rakuten Golden Eagles players
Tokyo Yakult Swallows players